John George of Monferrat (20 January 1488 – 30 April 1533) was the last Marquis of Montferrat of the Palaeologus-Montferrat family.

He was son of Boniface III, Marquis of Montferrat and his third wife Maria of Serbia, daughter of prince Stefan Branković of Serbia.

Reign
John George was Bishop of Casale, when his nephew Boniface IV, Marquis of Montferrat unexpectedly died in 1530 without an heir.

As the last of his family and despite his poor health, John George had no option than to become the new Marquis. In a desperate attempt to produce an heir, he married the 41-year-old Julia, daughter of Frederick IV of Naples, on 21 April 1533.  He died 9 days later.

After a Spanish occupation of 3 years, Montferrat came under Federico II Gonzaga, Duke of Mantua, who had married his niece Margaret Paleologa in 1531.

Descendants
John George had an illegitimate son, Flaminio, from the Paleologo-Oriundi line descends and is extant today.

Sources

Ancestry

References

1488 births
1533 deaths
16th-century Italian nobility
Palaiologos dynasty
Marquesses of Montferrat